Elvis Brajković (born 12 June 1969) is a Croatian retired professional footballer who played as a defender.

Club career
He played for several clubs, including NK Rijeka, TSV 1860 Munich (Germany), Hellas Verona F.C. (Italian Serie A in 1996–97), Hajduk Split, NK Pomorac and HNK Šibenik. He played for the Mexican teams Santos Laguna (Torreón, Coahuila) and Atlante (Mexico City) where he figured two matches as captain in the summer 2000 season. From 2005–06 he played in the Croatian third division for Velebit Benkovac and later for Primorac Biograd, also in third division.

International career
He made his debut for Croatia in an April 1994 friendly match away against Slovakia and earned a total of 8 caps scoring 2 goals. His final international was an April 1996 friendly against Hungary.

Brajković was a participant at the 1996 UEFA European Championship.

Managerial career
In February 2021, Brajković was replaced by Zoran Peruško as manager of Rudar Labin. He was appointed manager of Pazinka Pazin in July 2021, while also being an assistant to Tomislav Rukavina at the U-17 national team.

Career statistics

References

External links
 
 

1969 births
Living people
Footballers from Rijeka
Association football defenders
Croatian footballers
Croatia international footballers
UEFA Euro 1996 players
HNK Rijeka players
TSV 1860 Munich players
Hellas Verona F.C. players
HNK Hajduk Split players
Santos Laguna footballers
Atlante F.C. footballers
Hapoel Petah Tikva F.C. players
NK Pomorac 1921 players
HNK Šibenik players
HNK Primorac Biograd na Moru players
Croatian Football League players
Bundesliga players
Serie A players
Liga MX players
First Football League (Croatia) players
Second Football League (Croatia) players
Croatian expatriate footballers
Expatriate footballers in Germany
Expatriate footballers in Italy
Expatriate footballers in Mexico
Expatriate footballers in Israel
Croatian expatriate sportspeople in Germany
Croatian expatriate sportspeople in Italy
Croatian expatriate sportspeople in Mexico
Croatian expatriate sportspeople in Israel
Croatian football managers
HNK Orijent managers
HNK Rijeka non-playing staff